Time in the Marshall Islands, an island country consisting of over 29 coral atolls, is given by Marshall Islands Time (MHT; UTC+12:00). The Marshall Islands does not have an associated daylight saving time.

It is located near the equator, slightly west of the International Date Line.

History 

The Kwajalein Atoll of the Marshall Islands formerly observed UTC-12:00, which made communicating and trading with the other atolls observing UTC+12:00 a day ahead highly problematic. Due to this, the Kwajalein Atoll advanced 24 hours to the Eastern Hemisphere side of the International Date Line by skipping 21 August 1993.

IANA time zone database 
The IANA time zone database gives the Marshall Islands two zones:

References

External links 
Marshall Island Time (MHT) at TimeAndDate.com
Current time in Majuro, Marshall Islands at Time.is